El mundo del flamenco (The World of Flamenco) is an album by Paco de Lucía.

Track listing
"Guajiras de Lucía" – 3:13
"Con el pensamiento" – 4:39
"Al Tempul” – 3:38
"Al Puerto" – 4:48
"María de los Dolores" – 3:25
"Taconeo gitano" – 3:00
"Callecita que subes" – 4:56
"Recuerdos" – 3:06
"El Impetu" (Mario Escudero) – 2:59
"El Rinconcillo" – 2:51

Musicians
Paco de Lucía – Flamenco guitar
Ramón de Algeciras – Flamenco guitar
Pepe de Lucía - Vocals
Raúl - Zapateado

References
 Gamboa, Manuel José and Nuñez, Faustino. (2003). Paco de Lucía. Madrid:Universal Music Spain.

1971 albums
Paco de Lucía albums
PolyGram albums